Karl Josef Weinmair (1906–October 1944), also known as Karl Weinmair,  was an early twentieth century German artist. His lithographs during the period of the Weimar Republic express the resignation and despair of the poverty and unemployment of the time.  Later cartoon style pen and ink work drawn secretly during the Nazi regime caricatures the Nazis. Weinmair was killed at the beginning of October 1944 by an airplane bombing attack.

External links
 Sheet from the secret "Skizzenbuch zum Tausendjährigen Reich" (sketchbook for the Thousand Year Reich) at the Deutsches Historisches Museum (German Historical Museum).
 1918-33 at the DHM, in German.

20th-century German artists
1906 births
1944 deaths
German civilians killed in World War II
Deaths by airstrike during World War II